Pervomayskoye is a rural locality (a selo) and the administrative centre of Pervomaysky Selsoviet, Sterlitamaksky District, Bashkortostan, Russia. The population was 918 as of 2010. There are 10 streets.

Geography 
Pervomayskoye is located 48 km northwest of Sterlitamak (the district's administrative centre) by road. Abdrakhmanovo is the nearest rural locality.

References 

Rural localities in Sterlitamaksky District